Luis José Ramfis Rafael Domínguez-Trujillo, also known as Ramfis Domínguez-Trujillo (born May 22, 1970) is an American politician.

Biography 
Domínguez-Trujillo is known for being the grandson of Dominican dictator Rafael Trujillo, who ruled the Dominican Republic from 1930 to 1961. He is the son of Trujillo's daughter, Angelita Trujillo. He is father to three daughters: María Mercedes, María Laura, and María Julia, all born in the United States.

Domínguez-Trujillo went to high school in Miami. He graduated from business administration and comparative and international instructions at the University of Miami, and from there he devoted himself entirely to business, organizing his first company at the age of 21. In 1994, he was recognized by "America's Who's Who" as one of the most outstanding young entrepreneurs in the United States.

In 2016, he announced his intentions to become candidate for President of the Dominican Republic in 2020. Initially, the candidacy was under the political party PDI (Institutional Democratic Party or Partido Demócrata Institucional), but left the ticket in 2019 to pursue the presidency as an independent, making him the first candidate to do so. In late 2019 he reached an agreement to be the presidential candidate with the National Citizen Will Party. However, in early 2020, the Junta Central Electoral, the institution in charge of arranging the general elections, did not accept his candidacy given that his dual nationality did not permit him to run, according to the country's constitution.

Family tree

References

External links

Rafael Trujillo
People from Manhattan
1970 births
American politicians of Dominican Republic descent
Dominican Republic people of Canarian descent
Dominican Republic people of French descent
Dominican Republic people of Haitian descent
Dominican Republic people of Spanish descent
Living people